Lycomimus is a genus of longhorn beetles of the subfamily Lamiinae, containing the following species:

 Lycomimus albocinctus Melzer, 1931
 Lycomimus ampliatus  (Klug, 1825)
 Lycomimus formosus (Chemsak & Linsley, 1984)

References

Hemilophini